Maratus scutulatus is a species of Australian spider in the family Salticidae.

Description

The female body length is 7 mm, the male to 5 mm. Food is small insects. Often seen on bark of trees or foliage in moist areas of eastern Australia.

References

Salticidae
Spiders of Australia
Spiders described in 1881